Beauraing is a city and municipality of Wallonia located in the province of Namur, Belgium. 
On January 1, 2018, Beauraing had a total population of 9,160. The total area is 174.55 km2, giving a population density of 52 inhabitants per km2.

History
The municipality of Beauraing was created in 1977 and consists of the following districts: Beauraing, Baronville, Dion, Felenne, Feschaux, Focant, Froidfontaine, Honnay, Javingue, Martouzin-Neuville, Pondrôme, Vonêche, Wancennes, Wiesme and Winenne.

Beauraing is a place of pilgrimage for Catholics ever since five children and young adults reported 33 apparitions of the Blessed Virgin Mary between November 29, 1932, and January 3, 1933. The sobriquet applied to these apparitions is Our Lady of Beauraing, the Virgin of the Golden Heart. The apparitions are among those which are officially sanctioned by the Church.

On June 17th, 2021, the town was hit by a small tornado, damaging 92 houses and injuring several people.

See also
 List of protected heritage sites in Beauraing

References

External links

 Sanctuary of Our Lady of Beauraing

Cities in Wallonia
Municipalities of Namur (province)
Shrines to the Virgin Mary